Cape Byron Rudolf Steiner School is an independent, co-educational, non-sectarian school providing education from grades K-12. Located approximately six kilometres west of Byron Bay in the suburb of Ewingsdale it has students from the Byron Shire and wider Northern Rivers region.

References

Private primary schools in New South Wales
Private secondary schools in New South Wales
Rudolf Steiner
1988 establishments in Australia
Byron Bay, New South Wales